Kazakhstan Temir Joly (KTJ), also National Company Kazakhstan Temir Joly, is the national railway company of Kazakhstan.

Organization 
Founded by the government in 2002 as a joint stock company KTZ’s task is to develop, operate, and maintain railway transportation in Kazakhstan. It is headquartered in Astana. Related stock companies own the rolling stock, the hauling equipment, and the passenger transport division. Repair facilities have been privatized. Private companies may own or rent rolling stock that can use the rail system.

Network 

KTZ controls about  track (2005) which is being expanded. The Kazakhstan sections of the old Trans-Aral Railway, the Trans-Caspian railway, and the Turkestan-Siberia Railway have been incorporated into the KTZ.   are electrified at 25 kV 50 Hz AC.

Operation 
KTZ is the largest employer in Kazakhstan with 119,071 employees (2020). Approximately 1% of the Kazakh population are employed by the railroads and affiliated companies. It manages 46,800 freight wagons, 1,700 locomotives and 2,300 passenger cars. The company is profitable and its 2020 revenues were 1,173.3 billion Kazakhstani tenge. In 2020, the freight industry saw increases in overall tonnage of 3.5% versus the previous year, while passenger volume decreased by 54.5%.

Owners and management 

100% of KTZ's shares are owned by the state through the Samruk-Kazyna fund.
Yury Lavrinenko is the chairman of the Board of Directors of Kazakhstan Temir Zholy.
Nurlan Sauranbayev is the chairman of the management board of the company.
Arman Turlykhanovich Sultanov is the director of JSC "Civil passenger traffic" (АО "Пассажирские перевозки") and Mukhit Mukhtiarovich Momynkul is the director of affiliated branch "Express" ("Экспресс").

Infrastructure investment initiatives 
Temir Zholy is a principal implementer of Kazakhstan’s New Silk Road Initiative and Nurly Zhol new economic policy.

Khorgos-Eastern Gate 
The FEZ "Khorgos-Eastern Gate" is a logistics center for the distribution of cargo flows on the New Silk Road near Nurkent and Khorgos, and further integrates Kazakhstan into the global transport and trade system, particularly between China and the European Union.

The TransKazakhstanTrunk Railways project 

The potential of Kazakhstan to act as a transit in the trade between China, Europe, and even the eastern coast of America, as envisioned in the Trans-Asian Railway proposal, has not yet been fulfilled. Current rail transport between China and Europe as part of the Eurasian Land Bridge goes over the Trans-Siberian railway, is lengthy, and requires bogie exchanges.

Currently the plan is to run the railway through Turkmenistan to Iran; Iran is linked to Turkey and Europe's standard gauge system In May 2013, a new rail link opened between Uzen (Kazakhstan) and Serhetyaka (Turkmenistan), crossing the border at Bolashak. The railway is 146 km long and cost 65bn tenge. The railway is Russian gauge; there would be a break of gauge when the railway reaches the Iranian border.

Construction for the new line will start at the eastern border town of Druzhba to go to Aktau on the Caspian Sea. Construction is expected to start in 2006 and take four years. The total cost of the project is $5–7 billion. A link from Aktau to Iran is also required.

The transport corridor through Kazakhstan has the potential to provide a railway-ship link between China and the east coast of North America through the Northern East West corridor.

Railway links with adjacent countries 
 Russia – same gauge (former Soviet Union railway system)
 China – break of gauge /; border stations at Druzhba (connecting to Alashankou on the Lanxin railway) and at Korgas.
 Kyrgyzstan – same gauge (former Soviet Union railway system)
 Uzbekistan – same gauge (former Soviet Union railway system)
 Turkmenistan – same gauge (former Soviet Union railway system) – new rail link opened in 2013.

Rolling stock 
In October 2010, Kazakhstan Temir Zholy ordered 295 KZ8A electric locomotives from Alstom, for both freight and passenger services. On October 3, the first train of this order was delivered during an official ceremony. While the first 10 pre-series of KZ8A locomotives are being manufactured at Alstom’s Belfort facility, the remaining will be built in Nur-Sultan, in the new Alstom plant in Kazakhstan which will be inaugurated on December 12, 2012. Besides, on October 8, 2012, KTZ signed its first maintenance contract with Alstom for the full maintenance, major overhaul and modernization of 27 passenger locomotives KZ4AC for a period of 25 years.

In November 2010, KTZ awarded Talgo a contract to replace its fleet of 3000 intercity vehicles. After the delivery of some of these vehicles, it was announced in October 2019 that this order had been cancelled.

High-speed railway project 

In the early 2010s, a project for building a high-speed railway between Nur-Sultan and Almaty was actively discussed by the Kazakh and Chinese officials. However, in 2013 the project was postponed due to high cost.

See also 
 Narrow gauge railways in Kazakhstan
 Transport in Kazakhstan
 Tengri Unitrade CARGO
 North-South Transport Corridor
 Ashgabat agreement, a Multimodal transport agreement signed by India, Oman, Iran, Turkmenistan, Uzbekistan and Kazakhstan, for creating an international transport and transit corridor facilitating transportation of goods between Central Asia and the Persian Gulf.

References

External links 

 
 Report on KTZ
 Interview with Chairman of KTZ
 UN report on Trans Asian Railway
Maps
  (incomplete coverage)
UNJLC map (incomplete coverage)
 Detailed map pavaroz.com
 UN map

1997 establishments in Kazakhstan
Companies based in Astana
Railway companies of Kazakhstan
Government-owned companies of Kazakhstan
Railway companies established in 1997
Kazakhstani brands